Miles Okazaki (born 1974) is an American jazz guitarist and composer. Okazaki is a lecturer of jazz guitar at the University of Michigan in Ann Arbor.

Early life
Okazaki grew up in Port Townsend, Washington. When he was six, he began lessons on classical guitar. From a young age he was exposed to music and art, primarily because his mother was a painter and his father was a photography professor at Washington State University.

Discography

As leader 
 Mirror (self-released, 2006)
 I Like Too Much with Partipilo, Dan Weiss (Auand, 2008) – live recorded in 2007
 Generations (Sunnyside, 2009)
 Figurations (Sunnyside, 2012)
 Trickster (Pi Recordings, 2017)
 Work Volumes 1–6 (The Complete Compositions of Thelonious Monk) (self-released, 2018)
 The Sky Below (Pi Recordings, 2019)
 Trickster's Dream (self-released, 2020)

As sideman or guest
With Steve Coleman
 Functional Arrhythmias (Pi, 2013)
 Synovial Joints (Pi, 2015)
 Live at the Village Vanguard Vol. I  (Pi, 2018)

With Jane Monheit
 Taking a Chance on Love (Sony Classical, 2004)
 The Season (Epic, 2005)
 Surrender (Concord, 2007)

With others
 Jesse Malin, The Heat (One Little Indian, 2004)
 Matt Mitchell, Phalanx Ambassadors (Pi, 2019)
 Adam Rudolph, Turning Towards the Light (Cuneiform, 2015)
 Tessa Souter, Listen Love (Nara Music, 2004)
 John Zorn-Mary Halvorson Quartet, Paimon: Book of Angels Volume 32 (Tzadik, 2017)

References

External links
Official site

1974 births
Living people
People from Pullman, Washington
American musicians of Japanese descent
University of Michigan faculty
Sunnyside Records artists
Pi Recordings artists
Jazz musicians from Washington (state)